Henry Kyle (Keenan) Frese (born October 27, 1988) is a former employee at the Defense Intelligence Agency, between February 2018 and October 2019, during which time he was assigned to a facility in Virginia.

Frese held "Top Secret" (TS) clearance.

Indictment
Frese was charged with two violations of the Espionage Act under 18 USC 793(d) by a grand jury in the Eastern District of Virginia for willful transmission of National Defense Information.  He was arrested at work at the Defense Intelligence Agency in Reston, Virginia, on October 9, 2019.

The Justice Department alleged that Frese disclosed the top secret information to newspaper reporters, one of which Justice alleged was a reporter with whom Frese may have been involved in a "romantic relationship," and whom the government referred to as "Journalist 1;" Erik Wemple of The Washington Post identified the journalist as Amanda Macias, as did The Wall Street Journal, which also identified a second involved journalist as Courtney Kube, a senior reporter for NBC.

On February 20, 2020, Frese pleaded guilty to the willful transmission of Top Secret national defense information.

The Washington Post, News of Australia, and The Spectator all compared Frese's case to that of Senate Intelligence Committee staffer James Wolfe, who allegedly passed on secrets to Ali Watkins during a romantic relationship.

Sentencing
On June 18, 2020, Frese was sentenced to 30 months in prison for "leaking information to two journalists, including one he was dating"; prosecutors had asked for nine years, but his defense argued, among others, that his girlfriend, “a reporter whose 'career was stalling',” had pressured and influenced him at a susceptible time.  While he at first rebuffed her cajoling, his “judgment was clouded by 'a misguided effort to salvage a relationship that was not worth saving'.”

Personal life
Frese had Canadian citizenship, which he gave up to work in U.S. Intelligence.  As of 2019, Frese was in a romantic relationship with Amanda Macias, with whom he shared a home.

See also
Honeypot

References

1988 births
Living people
People of the Defense Intelligence Agency
Prisoners and detainees of the United States federal government